The 1906 Toronto Argonauts season was the Argonaut Football Club's 9th season of organized league play since joining the Ontario Rugby Football Union 1898, and its final season playing in the ORFU senior series. The team finished in second place in the series with four wins and two losses, while the Hamilton Tigers qualified for the Dominion playoffs by winning the series with a perfect record.

After playing the 1905 season under the name "Toronto-Argonauts" following a merger with the Toronto Rugby Club, on September 7 the club decided to revert to the simpler "Argonaut Rugby Club" name.

Having managed the club to a 4-2 record in 1905, W. A. Hewitt returned for a second season as manager in 1906. On September 26 the club announced the appointment of Chaucer Elliott as coach, making Elliott the first coach in club history.

Regular season

Standings

Schedule

References

Toronto Argonauts seasons